Tea Break Over–Back on Your 'Eads! is the eighth studio album by British jazz-rock band If. Released on 7 March 1975, it was their final studio album for over 40 years, until the release of If 5 in 2016 following their reunion. Tea Break Over was followed in 1995 by a compilation CD covering tracks from the first three LPs featuring the band's previous line-up.

The album reflects the band's more rock-influenced style, perfectly balanced with Dick Morrissey's harsher hard bop/bebop sax playing. The title track "Tea Break", referring to the hardships of being "on the road", is the punch line to an old musicians' joke and contains a tribute to Charlie Parker in the lyrics ("The Bird was the man to be heard" and "The music was the word") as well as in a swirling bebop tenor solo. The "Ballad of the Yessirom Kid", a tribute by the band to Dick Morrissey, finishes with a roaring bebop tenor solo. "Song for Alison" features the flute more than holding its own with a rock accompaniment. The song "Don Quixote" opens with an extensive acoustic Spanish guitar solo by Whitehorn.

Track listing 
(LP version - the CD re-release varies the order slightly)

Side one
"Merlin the Magic Man" (Davies) – 5:05
"I Had a Friend" (Davies) – 4:30
"Tea Break Over, Back on Your 'Eads" (Whitehorn, Davies, Monaghan) – 6:05

Side two
"Ballad of the Yessirrom Kid" (Davies) – 5:20
"Raw Sewage" (Davies) – 6:13
"Song for Alison" (Morrissey) – 3:55
"Don Quixote's Masquerade" (Davies) – 7:50

Personnel
 Geoff Whitehorn - electric and acoustic guitars, lead vocals
 Dick Morrissey - electric & acoustic tenor, alto & soprano saxes; flute
 Gabriel Magno – keyboards, organ, piano, synthesiser
 Walt Monaghan – bass, backing vocals
 Cliff Davies – drums, vibraphone, backing vocals
Guest:
 Carlos Martinez – percussion

References

1975 albums
If (band) albums